The Eagle's Brood is a 1935 American Western film directed by Howard Bretherton and written by Doris Schroeder and Harrison Jacobs. The film stars William Boyd, James Ellison, William Farnum, George "Gabby" Hayes, Addison Richards, Nana Martinez and Frank Shannon. The film was released on October 25, 1935, by Paramount Pictures.
 
El Toro the outlaw saves Hoppy's life, so Hoppy agrees to help find his missing grandson.

Plot summary

Cast  
 William Boyd as Bill Hop-Along Cassidy
 James Ellison as Johnny Nelson 
 William Farnum as El Toro
 George "Gabby" Hayes as Bartender Spike
 Addison Richards as Big Henry
 Nana Martinez as Dolores 
 Frank Shannon as Henchman Mike
 Dorothy Revier as Dolly
 Paul Fix as Henchman Steve
 Al Lydell as Panhandle
 John Merton as Henchman Ed
 George Mari as Pablo Chavez
 Juan Torena as Esteban
 Henry Sylvester as Sheriff

References

External links 

 
 
 }
 

1935 films
American Western (genre) films
1935 Western (genre) films
Paramount Pictures films
Films directed by Howard Bretherton
Hopalong Cassidy films
American black-and-white films
1930s English-language films
1930s American films